Friedrich Seitz (12 June 1848, Günthersleben-Wechmar, Saxe-Coburg and Gotha – 22 May 1918) was a German Romantic Era composer. He was a violinist who served as a concertmaster, who wrote chamber music and eight student concertos for the violin.

Life 
Seitz studied violin first under Karl Wilhelm Uhlrich in Sondershausen, Germany; he later married Uhlrich's daughter. He became music director at Sondershausen and thereafter became a concertmaster at Magdeburg. In 1884 he was the Hofkonzertmeister (conductor of the court orchestra) at Dessau.

Movements from Seitz' student concerti (No. 2) have become more widely known by virtue of their inclusion in the Suzuki violin method instructional material.

Selected compositions
Schüler-Konzert Nr. 1 (Pupil's Concerto No. 1) in D major for violin and piano, Op. 7
Schüler-Konzert Nr. 2 (Pupil's Concerto No. 2) in G major for violin and piano, Op. 13
Schüler-Konzert Nr. 3 (Pupil's Concerto No. 3) in G minor for violin and piano, Op. 12
Schüler-Konzert Nr. 4 (Pupil's Concerto No. 4) in D major for violin and piano, Op. 15
Sechs leichte Vortragsstücke in Form einer Suite f. V. od. Vcello (1. Lage) m. Pfte. Magdeburg, Rathke. 1896.
 Frohe Wanderschaft (A Pleasant Walk)
 In der Waldmühle (The Woodland Mill)
 Bei der Grossmutter (With Grandmother)
 Zigeuner kommen (Gipsies Are Coming)
 Auf dem Kinderball (The Children's Ball)
 Sehnsucht nach der Heimat (Longing for Home)
Schüler-Klaviertrio Nr. 1 (Pupil's Piano Trio No. 1) in C major for violin, cello and piano, Op. 18
 Romanze und Intermezzo, Op. 21
Schüler-Konzert Nr. 5 (Pupil's Concerto No. 5) in D major for violin and piano, Op. 22 (1909)
 Konzert in einem Satz zum Studium und Konzertgebrauch (Concerto in One Movement for Study and Concert Use) in A minor for violin and piano or orchestra, Op. 25
Drei Grabgesänge für gefallene Krieger for mixed chorus, Op. 28; poetry by August Sieghardt
Schüler-Konzert Nr. 6 (Pupil's Concerto No. 6) in G major for violin and piano, Op. 31
Schüler-Konzert Nr. 7 (Pupil's Concerto No. 7) in D minor for violin and piano, Op. 32
Quartet in G Major for 2 violins (or violin and viola), cello and piano, Op. 35
Konzertstück (Concert Piece) in A major for violin and piano, Op. 36
Schüler-Konzert Nr. 8 (Pupil's Concerto No. 8) in G major for violin and piano, Op. 38
Short works for violin and piano (Opp. 41, 45, 46)
Ungarische Rhapsodie (Hungarian Rhapsody) for violin and piano, Op. 47
Schüler-Konzert Nr. 8 [sic] (Pupil's Concerto No. 8) in A major for violin and piano, Op. 51
 Die Passion, Oratorio for soloists, chorus, orchestra and organ
 Zwei neue Vortragsstücke for violin and piano
   Andante espressivo
   Allegro vivace
Schüler-Klaviertrio Nr. 2 (Pupil's Piano Trio No. 2) for violin, cello and piano
Schüler-Klaviertrio Nr. 3 (Pupil's Piano Trio No. 3) for violin, cello and piano

External links
Some information about Seitz 

1848 births
1918 deaths
19th-century classical composers
20th-century classical composers
Concertmasters
People from Gotha (district)
People from Saxe-Coburg and Gotha
German Romantic composers
German male classical composers
20th-century German composers
19th-century German composers
20th-century German male musicians
19th-century German male musicians
Male classical violinists